Boston Shamrocks  may refer to:

Boston Shamrocks (AFL), an American football team
Boston Shamrocks (basketball), a basketball exhibition team
Boston Jr. Shamrocks, a Junior A hockey team playing in the Eastern Junior Hockey League